Aceratheriinae is an extinct subfamily of rhinoceros endemic to Asia, Africa, Europe, and North America, from the Oligocene through the Pliocene.

Taxonomy
Aceratheriinae was named by Dollo (1885). It was assigned to Rhinocerotida by Codrea (1992); and to Rhinocerotidae by Prothero (1998), Antoine et al. (2000), Kaya and Heissig (2001), Sach and Heizmann (2001) and Deng (2005).

The following genera are recognized as valid:
Aceratherium
Acerorhinus
Alicornops
Aphelops 
Aprotodon 
Brachydiceratherium
Brachypotherium
Chilotherium
Diaceratherium
Dromoceratherium
Floridaceras
Galushaceras 
Hoploaceratherium
Mesaceratherium
Peraceras
Persiatherium
Plesiaceratherium
Proaceratherium
Prosantorhinus
Shansirhinus
Subchilotherium
Teleoceras

References

Pliocene extinctions
Oligocene first appearances